Forestville is a census-designated place (CDP) in Hamilton County, Ohio, United States. The population was 10,615 at the 2020 census.

Geography
Forestville is located at  (39.070853, -84.337037).

Demographics

At the 2000 census there were 10,978 people, 4,368 households, and 2,948 families living in the CDP. The population density was 2,981.7 people per square mile (1,151.8/km). There were 4,503 housing units at an average density of 1,223.0/sq mi (472.5/km).  The racial makeup of the CDP was 95.72% White, 0.87% African American, 0.05% Native American, 2.22% Asian, 0.01% Pacific Islander, 0.31% from other races, and 0.82% from two or more races. Hispanic or Latino of any race were 1.06%.

Of the 4,368 households 34.2% had children under the age of 18 living with them, 57.3% were married couples living together, 8.0% had a female householder with no husband present, and 32.5% were non-families. 29.4% of households were one person and 16.3% were one person aged 65 or older. The average household size was 2.49 and the average family size was 3.12.

The age distribution was 27.1% under the age of 18, 5.8% from 18 to 24, 26.9% from 25 to 44, 24.2% from 45 to 64, and 16.0% 65 or older. The median age was 39 years. For every 100 females, there were 86.6 males. For every 100 females age 18 and over, there were 82.7 males.

The median household income was $57,850 and the median family income  was $76,020. Males had a median income of $56,488 versus $36,493 for females. The per capita income for the CDP was $30,493. About 2.5% of families and 3.6% of the population were below the poverty line, including 3.9% of those under age 18 and 6.5% of those age 65 or over.

References

Census-designated places in Hamilton County, Ohio
Census-designated places in Ohio